The 2011 Missouri Valley Conference men's basketball tournament, popularly referred to as "Arch Madness", as part of the 2010-11 NCAA Division I men's basketball season was played in St. Louis, Missouri March 3–6, 2011 at the Scottrade Center. The championship game was broadcast live on CBS on Sunday, March 6 at 1:05 pm CST. The tournament's winner received the Missouri Valley Conference's automatic bid to the 2011 NCAA Men's Division I Basketball Tournament

After coming from behind in each their first two games, the #1 seed Missouri State Bears fell short to #3 seed Indiana State. Indiana State, who had needed a buzzer-beater against Evansville in the first round, made their first NCAA tournament appearance in a decade. They also defeated #2 seed Wichita State in the semifinal, en route to only their third NCAA Tournament since Larry Bird played on their team. Aaron Carter led the Sycamores in the win with 15 points.

Tournament Bracket

2010–11 Missouri Valley Conference men's basketball season
Missouri Valley Conference men's basketball tournament